The pound was the currency of South Carolina until 1793. Initially, sterling coin circulated, supplemented from 1703 by local paper money. Although these notes were denominated in £sd, they were worth less than sterling, with 1 South Carolina shilling = 8d sterling. The first issues were known as "Proclamation Money". They were replaced by the "Lawful Money" issue in 1748, with 1 Lawful shilling = 4⅔ Proclamation shillings.

The State of South Carolina issued Continental currency denominated in £sd and Spanish dollars with 1 dollar =  shillings (8 dollars = 13 pounds). The continental currency was replaced by the U.S. dollar at a rate of 1000 continental dollars = 1 U.S. dollar. (See hyperinflation.)

References

Notes

Bibliography 
Newman, Eric P. The Early Paper Money of America. 5th edition. Iola, Wisconsin: Krause Publications, 2008. .

Historical currencies of the United States
1793 disestablishments in the United States
Pre-statehood history of South Carolina
Economy of South Carolina